Shigenori Mori (born 9 May 1958) is a Japanese professional golfer.

Mori played on the Japan Golf Tour, winning twice.

Professional wins (2)

Japan Golf Tour wins (2)

External links

Japanese male golfers
Japan Golf Tour golfers
Sportspeople from Kanagawa Prefecture
1958 births
Living people